The Lafayette Journal & Courier is a daily newspaper owned by Gannett, serving Lafayette, Indiana, and the surrounding communities. It was established in 1920 through the merger of two local papers, the Journal and Free Press (established in 1829 under the name John B. Semans' Free Press) and the Courier (established in 1845). 

In 2016, the newspaper moved from its long-time downtown headquarters to a new building on Lafayette's east side, closer to its press and production facility.

Format 

With its change of format on July 31, 2006, the Journal & Courier became the first daily newspaper in North America to use the Berliner layout.

Circulation 

As of September 2010, average daily circulation is 27,837. Sunday circulation is 39,343. 

The Journal & Courier is one of 35 Gannett newspapers that contain a seven-day edition of USA Today.

Trivia 

 In 2008, the Journal & Courier sponsored Sameer Mishra, the winner of the 81st Scripps National Spelling Bee.

References

External links

 The Journal & Courier
 Official mobile website
 Gannett Company
 Gannett subsidiary profile of the Journal and Courier
 City of Lafayette, IN website
 Purdue University website

Newspapers published in Indiana
Gannett publications
Mass media in Lafayette, Indiana